is a Japanese animation studio founded in 2013.

Works

Anime television series
Miritari! (2015)
Danchigai (2015)
Hacka Doll the Animation (2015) 
Ojisan and Marshmallow (2016)
Ozmafia!! (2016)
Bloodivores (2016)
Kiitarō Shōnen no Yōkai Enikki (2016)
Miss Bernard said. (2016)
NTR: Netsuzou Trap (2017)
Love Is Like a Cocktail (2017)
Tachibanakan To Lie Angle (2018; with Studio Lings)
Rinshi!! Ekoda-chan (2019, episodes 2 and 5)

Original video animation
It's My Life (2019)

Original net animation
God Eater Reso Nantoka Gekijou (2018; with Passione)
Musunde Hiraite (2018)

Music videos
Meychan: Nanba Anain (2020)

References

External links
Official website 

 
Animation studios in Tokyo
Anime companies
Japanese companies established in 2013
Mass media companies established in 2013
Film production companies of Japan
Japanese animation studios